Hugo Villar Tejeiro (20 November 1925 – 15 April 2014) was a Uruguayan physician and politician. He is best known for co-founding the left-wing political party Broad Front in 1971. He was born in Montevideo.

Villar died on 15 April 2014 in Montevideo, aged 88.

References

1925 births
2014 deaths
Physicians  from Montevideo
Uruguayan people of Spanish descent
20th-century Uruguayan physicians
Broad Front (Uruguay) politicians